Cyril Knowles ( – ) was an English professional rugby league footballer who played in the 1930s and 1940s.

Background
Cyril Knowles' birth was registered in Hemsworth district, Wakefield, West Riding of Yorkshire, England, he lived in Fitzwilliam, Wakefield , and his death aged 42 was registered in Hemsworth district, Wakefield, West Riding of Yorkshire, England.

Playing career

Club career
Cyril Knowles was signed by Wakefield Trinity during August 1934, made his début for Wakefield Trinity during November 1934, he played his last match for Wakefield Trinity during the 1937–38 season, he was transferred from Wakefield Trinity to York during October 1937 to replace Tommy Dingsdale, he made his début for York and scored 2-goals against Halifax on Saturday 9 October 1937, and he made his début for Featherstone Rovers against York on Tuesday 26 March 1940, he appears to have scored no drop-goals (or field-goals as they are currently known in Australasia), but prior to the 1974–75 season all goals, whether; conversions, penalties, or drop-goals, scored 2-points, consequently prior to this date drop-goals were often not explicitly documented, therefore '0' drop-goals may indicate drop-goals not recorded, rather than no drop-goals scored. In addition, prior to the 1949–50 season, the archaic field-goal was also still a valid means of scoring points.

Genealogical information
Cyril Knowles' marriage to Jane (née Canning(s)) was registered during first ¼ 1944 in Hemsworth district. They had seven children: the future association footballer; Cyril Knowles, the future association footballer; Peter Knowles, Susan Knowles (birth registered during fourth ¼  in Hemsworth district), Kelvin Knowles (birth registered during third ¼  in Hemsworth district), Rosie Knowles (birth registered during fourth ¼  in Hemsworth district), Richard Knowles (birth registered during fourth ¼  in Hemsworth district) and Zena Knowles (birth registered during fourth ¼  in Hemsworth district).

References

External links
Search for "Knowles" at rugbyleagueproject.org
Search for "Cyril Knowles" at britishnewspaperarchive.co.uk

1915 births
1957 deaths
English rugby league players
Featherstone Rovers players
People from Hemsworth
Rugby league fullbacks
Rugby league players from Wakefield
Wakefield Trinity players
York Wasps players